Utthama Chola (or Utthama Chola Lankeshwaran), was the son of Rajendra Chola II.

History 
After the death of Sangavarman Lankeshwaran (the elder brother of Rajendra II) in 1059 CE, Vijayabahu I revolted to usurp Sri Lanka. Rajendra Chola II invaded Sri Lanka to thwart the efforts of his rival. Following this, in 1059 CE, Utthama Chola was crowned as Governor of the Sinhala (Sri Lanka) with the title "Utthama Chola Lankeshwaran" by his father Rajendra II after defeating Vijayabahu I and expelled from Polonnaruwa. He then ruled over the entire expanse of Sri Lanka as a subordinate of his father from 1059 CE to 1072 CE before taking over Trincomalee (Northern province) of Sri Lanka which he ruled till 1093 CE.

References 

 Nilakanta Sastri, K.A. (1935). The CōĻas, University of Madras, Madras (Reprinted 1984).
 Nilakanta Sastri, K.A. (1955). A History of South India, OUP, New Delhi (Reprinted 2002).
Chola kings
11th-century Indian monarchs